The 1882–83 international cricket season was from September 1882 to March 1883. The tour was generally known as IFW Bligh's XI tour of Australia and considered as the birth of The Ashes.

Season overview

January

England in Australia

References

International cricket competitions by season
1882 in cricket
1883 in cricket